Marin Draganja and Mate Pavić were the defending champion, but lost in the semifinals to Andre Begemann and Matthew Ebden.

César Ramírez and Miguel Ángel Reyes-Varela won the title, defeating Andre Begemann and Matthew Ebden in the final, 6–4, 6–2.

Seeds

Draw

Draw

References
 Main Draw

Jalisco Open - Doubles
2014 Doubles